Antônio Marcos da Silva Filho known as  Marquinhos Paraná or just Marquinhos (little Marcos) (born 20 July 1977), is a former Brazilian right-back or defensive midfielder. He last played for Ventforet Kofu in the J. League Division 1.

Biography
In January 2008, his contract with J. League Division 1 club Júbilo Iwata had expired, and he returned to Brazil for Cruzeiro. His team-mate Fabrício and Henrique also joined Marquinhos Paraná at Cruzeiro on loan.

In January 2010 he signed a new 2-year contract with club.

Club career statistics

Honours
Paraná State League: 1996, 1997
Santa Catarina State League: 2006
Minas Gerais State League: 2008, 2009, 2011

References

External links

 Statistics on Soccerway
 websoccerclub 
 globoesporte 
 Futpedia 

1977 births
Living people
Brazilian footballers
Brazilian expatriate footballers
Paraná Clube players
Clube de Regatas Brasil players
Figueirense FC players
Marília Atlético Clube players
Avaí FC players
Expatriate footballers in Japan
Brazilian expatriate sportspeople in Japan
J1 League players
Júbilo Iwata players
Ventforet Kofu players
Cruzeiro Esporte Clube players
Sport Club do Recife players
América Futebol Clube (MG) players
Campeonato Brasileiro Série A players
Campeonato Brasileiro Série B players
Association football midfielders
Sportspeople from Recife